The Communauté intercommunale Réunion Est (CIREST) is a communauté d'agglomération, an intercommunal structure in the Réunion overseas department and region of France. It was created in December 2001. Its seat is in Saint-Benoît. Its area is 735.8 km2. Its population was 127,133 in 2017.

Composition
The communauté d'agglomération consists of the following 6 communes:
Bras-Panon
La Plaine-des-Palmistes
Saint-André
Saint-Benoît
Sainte-Rose
Salazie

References

Reunion Est
Reunion Est